KF Gradec (FK Gradec) is a football club based in the village of Gradec near Gostivar, North Macedonia. They are currently competing in the OFS Gostivar league.

History
The club was founded in 1977.

References

External links
Gradec Facebook 
Club info at MacedonianFootball 
Football Federation of Macedonia 

Gradec
Association football clubs established in 1977
1977 establishments in the Socialist Republic of Macedonia
Gostivar Municipality
Gradec